Olympique Club de Khouribga, also called OCK, is a Moroccan football club based in Khouribga.

History

The club was founded in 1923 and is considered one of the oldest clubs in Morocco. The club first entered the first division of the Moroccan league in the 1982–1983 season. Olympique Club Khouribga holds 2 Moroccan cups or what is called the Throne cup (2006 and 2015) and 2 Moroccan Championship in 1989 and 2007.

On 17 November 2022, Khouribga sacked Lassaad Dridi for the team's poor performance. In December 2022, OCK appointed the portuguese manager Ricardo Formosinho.

Current squad
As of 24 November, 2021.

Notable coaches
 Yuriy Sevastyanenko (1988–89)
 José Faria (1995–97)
 François Bracci (2007)
 Richard Tardy (July 1, 2008 – March 31, 2009)
 Youssef Lamrini (July 2010–12)
 Badou Zaki (July 2012–12)
 François Bracci (July 1, 2012–12)
 Fouad Sahabi (Dec 5, 2012 – Dec 31, 2013)
 Mohammed Laksir (2014-2018)

Achievements

Moroccan League
2007
Runner-up : 1984, 1996, 2015

Moroccan Cup
2006, 2015
Runner-up : 1981, 1994, 1995, 2005

Arab Cup Winners' Cup: 1
1996
Champions Cup Mediterranean Sea: 1947

Performance in CAF competitions

CAF Champions League: 1 appearance
2008 – Third Round

CAF Confederation Cup: 3 appearances
2005 – First Round
2006 – Group stage
2008 – Third Round

References

External links
Official website

 
Football clubs in Morocco
Association football clubs established in 1923
1923 establishments in Morocco
Sports clubs in Morocco